Lympho-epithelial Kazal-type-related inhibitor (LEKTI) also known as serine protease inhibitor Kazal-type 5 (SPINK5) is a protein that in humans is encoded by the SPINK5 gene.

Structure and function 

LEKTI is a large multidomain serine protease inhibitor expressed in stratified epithelial tissue. It consists of 15 domains that are cleaved into smaller, functional fragments by the protease furin. Only two of these domains (2 and 15) contain 6 evenly spaced cysteines responsible for 3 intramolecular disulfide bonds characteristic of Kazal-type related inhibitors. The remaining domains contain 4 cysteines. These disulfide bonds force the molecule into a rigid conformation that enables the protein to interact with a target protease via an extended beta-sheet. All domains (excepting 1, 2 and 15) contain an arginine at P1, indicating trypsin-like proteases are the likely targets.

In the epidermis, LEKTI is implicated in the regulation of desquamation via its ability to selectively inhibit KLK5, KLK7 and KLK14. Recombinant full length LEKTI inhibits the exogenous serine proteases trypsin, plasmin, subtilisin A, cathepsin G and human neutrophil elastase.

LEKTI may play a role in skin and hair morphogenesis and anti-inflammatory and/or antimicrobial protection of mucous epithelia.

Gene 

SPINK5 is a member of a gene family cluster located on chromosome 5q32, which encode inhibitors of serine proteases. This includes other epidermal proteins SPINK6 and LEKTI-2 (SPINK9). The SPINK5 gene is 61 kb in length and contains 33 exons. Alternative processing of SPINK5 results in the formation of three different gene products, which have been identified in differentiated keratinocytes.

Clinical significance 

Mutations in the SPINK5 gene result in Netherton syndrome, a disorder characterized by ichthyosis and specific immune system defects.

See also
Kazal-type serine protease inhibitor domain

References

Further reading

External links